Palaeosepsioides is a genus of flies in the family Sepsidae.

Species
Palaeosepsioides erythromyrma (Silva, 1992)
Palaeosepsioides marshalli Ozerov, 2004
Palaeosepsioides neotropicanus Ozerov, 2004

References

Sepsidae
Diptera of North America
Diptera of South America
Brachycera genera